Sir Eric Paul McClintock (13 September 1918 – 27 March 2018) was an Australian public servant and businessman. He was notable for serving as chairman of Woolworths Limited from 1980 to 1987.

Early life
McClintock was born on 13 September 1918 in Gulgong, New South Wales, to Robert Emanuel McClintock (d. 1979), a newspaper proprietor and his wife, Ada Marion McClintock (née Whitton; 1888–1987). He was educated at De La Salle College, Armidale, and the University of Sydney.

Career
McClintock worked in the Naval Supply Office, Department of the Navy, 1935–1947. He joined the Australian Trade Commissioner Service, serving in Washington as Commercial Attaché on various international emergency food council committees.  He was appointed an Assistant Trade Commissioner in 1948, based in New York. He returned to Australia in 1951 as Director of Trade Promotion in the Department of Commerce and Agriculture.

He was a speech writer for future Prime Minister John McEwen, then Minister for Trade, and served as First Assistant Secretary, Department of Trade, 1958–1961. He was also associated with the Australian Industry Development Corporation.

After leaving the Public Service, he was chairman of Woolworths Limited from 1980 to 1987. During his tenure, the Dick Smith electronics business and Victorian supermarket chain Safeway were acquired, and the "Fresh Food People" slogan was instituted. In 1986, for the first time since 1923, no final dividend was paid on the company's shares.

Directorships and board appointments include Ashton Mining, the Asia Pacific Space Centre Advisory Board, and Commissioner of Medicare Australia
2004–05. He was NSW campaign chair for the Australian Prospectors & Miners' Hall of Fame (now defunct).

Personal life
McClintock was married to Lady Eve from 1943 until her death in 2013. They had three children; Paul, the former chairman of Myer and Medibank Private; Leigh, who followed his father into the Department of Trade and worked for Alcoa in North Asia; and Marjorie "Marg", an architect. In 2010, McClintock delivered the eulogy at the funeral of his friend and neighbour, the novelist Jon Cleary.

McClintock died in Sydney on 27 March 2018 at the age of 99.

Honours
Eric McClintock was knighted in the 1981 New Year's Honours for service to exports and industry.

References

1918 births
2018 deaths
Australian chief executives
Australian businesspeople in retailing
Australian Knights Bachelor
Australian public servants
Businesspeople awarded knighthoods